The 2023 Russian Figure Skating Championships were held from 20 to 25 December 2022 in Krasnoyarsk. Medals were awarded in the disciplines of men's singles, women's singles, pairs, and ice dance.

Qualifying 
In the 2022–23 season, Russian skaters will compete in domestic qualifying events and national championships for various age levels. The Russian Cup series, renamed this year as the "Russian Grand Prix" for senior skaters and the "All-Russian competitions" for junior skaters, leads to four events – the Russian Championships, the Russian Junior Championships, the Russian Grand Prix Final and the All-Russian final competitions "Federation Cup".

From March 1, 2022 onwards, the International Skating Union banned all figure skaters and officials from Russia and Belarus from attending any international competitions following the 2022 Russian invasion of Ukraine. As a result, all skaters were required to qualify through the Russian Grand Prix and the All-Russian competitions' series.

Medalists of most important competitions

Senior Championships 
The 2023 Russian Championships was held in Krasnoyarsk from 20 to 25 December 2022. Qualification is based on Russian Grand Prix series' results. In addition, figure skaters who were included in official pre-season national team roster but were unable to participate at the Russian Grand Prix series due to good reasons, can be included into list of participants by decision of the Executive Committee of the Figure Skating Federation of Russia.

Schedule
Listed in local time (UTC+07:00).

Preliminary entries
The Figure Skating Federation of Russia published the official list of participants on 14 December 2022.

Changes to preliminary entries

Results

Men

Women

Pairs

Ice dance

Junior Championships 
The 2023 Russian Junior Championships were held in Perm from 14 to 18 February 2023. Qualification was based on results of the All-Russian competitions' series (which were held alongside with the Russian Grand Prix series among senior skaters). In addition, figure skaters who were included in the official pre-season national team roster but were unable to participate at the All-Russian competitions' series due to good reasons, were included into list of participants by decision of the Executive Committee of the Figure Skating Federation of Russia.

Schedule
Listed in local time (UTC+05:00).

Preliminary entries

Changes to preliminary entries

Results

Men

Women

Pairs

Ice dance

International team selections

Winter World University Games
The 2023 Winter World University Games were held in Lake Placid, United States from 12 to 22 January  2023. However, on 12 March 2022, in accordance with a recommendation by the International Olympic Committee (IOC), FISU's Steering Committee suspended the participation of Russia from FISU competitions and activities due to the 2022 Russian invasion of Ukraine.

European Youth Olympic Winter Festival
The 2023 European Youth Olympic Winter Festival was held in Friuli-Venezia Giulia, Italy from 21 to 28 January 2023. However, on 2 March 2022, in accordance with a recommendation by the International Olympic Committee (IOC), European Olympic Committees (EOC) suspended the participation of Russia from European Youth Olympic Festivals due to the 2022 Russian invasion of Ukraine.

European Championships
The 2023 European Championships were held in Espoo, Finland from 25 to 29 January 2023. However, on 1 March 2022, in accordance with a recommendation by the International Olympic Committee (IOC), the International Skating Union (ISU) banned figure skaters and officials from Russia from attending all international competitions due to the 2022 Russian invasion of Ukraine.

World Junior Championships
Commonly referred to as "Junior Worlds", the 2023 World Junior Championships will be held in Calgary, Canada from 27 February to 5 March 2023. However, on 1 March 2022, in accordance with a recommendation by the International Olympic Committee (IOC), the International Skating Union (ISU) banned figure skaters and officials from Russia from attending all international competitions due to the 2022 Russian invasion of Ukraine.

World Championships
The 2023 World Championships will be held in Saitama, Japan from 20 to 26 March 2023. However, on 1 March 2022, in accordance with a recommendation by the International Olympic Committee (IOC), the International Skating Union (ISU) banned figure skaters and officials from Russia from attending all international competitions due to the 2022 Russian invasion of Ukraine.

World Team Trophy
The 2023 World Team Trophy will be held in Tokyo, Japan from 13 to 16 April 2023. However, on 1 March 2022, in accordance with a recommendation by the International Olympic Committee (IOC), the International Skating Union (ISU) banned figure skaters and officials from Russia from attending all international competitions due to the 2022 Russian invasion of Ukraine.

Notes

References 

Russian Figure Skating Championships
Russian Championships
Russian Championships
Figure Skating Championships
Figure Skating Championships